Pick of the Litter is the sixth studio album by American R&B group The Spinners, released in August 1975 on the Atlantic label. The album was produced by Thom Bell and recorded at Sigma Sound Studios in Philadelphia.

History
Pick of the Litter is generally considered the last of the quartet of classic Bell-produced studio albums the Spinners released between 1973 and 1975, and to mark the end of the most creative phase of the group’s career – while future releases would have memorable moments, contemporary critical opinion is that none of the group’s later material matches the enduring quality and top-notch consistency of these four albums.

Pick of the Litter became the Spinners’ highest placing album on the Billboard 200, reaching number eight; however it was the group’s first Atlantic album to miss the top of the R&B albums chart, peaking at number two. The album includes the distinctive "Games People Play", one of the group’s signature songs, which became their fifth single to top the R&B chart and a top 5 hit on the Billboard singles chart. The second single "Love or Leave" also made the R&B top 10.

Although not credited on the album sleeve, "Just as Long as We Have Love" includes vocal contributions from Dionne Warwick.

Track listing

Personnel
Billy Henderson, Bobby Smith, Philippé Wynne, Henry Fambrough, Pervis Jackson – vocals
Barbara Ingram, Carla Benson, Evette Benton – backing vocals
MFSB – strings, horns
Tony Bell, Bobby Eli, Don Murray – guitars
Thom Bell – keyboards
Bob Babbitt – bass guitar
Andrew Smith – drums
Larry Washington – congas, bongos
Dionne Warwick – vocals on "Just as Long as We Have Love" (uncredited)

Charts

Singles

References

External links
 

1975 albums
The Spinners (American group) albums
Albums produced by Thom Bell
Albums arranged by Thom Bell
Albums recorded at Sigma Sound Studios
Atlantic Records albums